Reservoir is a suburb in Melbourne, Victoria, Australia,  north of Melbourne's Central Business District, located within the City of Darebin local government area. Reservoir recorded a population of 51,096 at the 2021 census.

Reservoir is an established suburb with standard brick homes, weatherboard homes and an increasing number of new developments. The region contains popular recreation areas and facilities, including Edwardes Lake and the Reservoir Leisure Centre, and is home to the Edwardes Street and Broadway shopping strips.

History

The land which became the suburb of Reservoir was first surveyed by Robert Hoddle in 1837, and was formed from parts of both the Jika Jika Parish and Keelbundoora Parish.

The Rose Shamrock Hotel, formerly known as The Rose Shamrock & Thistle Hotel, opened on Plenty Road in 1854. Reservoir Post Office opened around 1921. Reservoir became a suburb at this time, with the name coming from the three water reservoirs first built in 1863.

The reservoirs were collectively known as Preston Reservoir, which continue to form part of the fresh water supplied to Melbourne's inner and western suburbs. The Maroondah Aqueduct was built in 1886–1891, to supply water to the Preston Reservoir from a diversion weir on the Watts River, which was dammed in 1927 to form Maroondah Reservoir.

In 1914, Thomas Dyer Edwardes donated an area of 34 acres of land to the people of the City of Preston; the land was developed into Edwardes Lake Park. Between 1919 and 1939, swimming was officially permitted in the lake, with the presence of the Preston Lifesaving Club, and regular demonstrations of swimming and lifesaving techniques were given.

Overview

Reservoir is close to the Northland Shopping Centre, Preston Market, the High Street food quarter, Sydney Road shops and restaurants and one of three remaining drive-in cinemas in Melbourne, the Village in Coburg. The area is experiencing unprecedented growth, with plenty of new developments.

In Reservoir, there is a mosque that was built by the Albanian Australian community.

Demographics

The most common ancestries in Reservoir were, according to the 2016 census, Italian 17.1%, Australian 14.8%, English 13.9%, Greek 6.3% and Irish 5.1%. 55.9% of people were born in Australia. The most common countries of birth were Italy 8.2%, India 4.4%, China (excludes SARs and Taiwan) 3.2%, Greece 3.0% and Vietnam 1.8%.

Transport

Bus
Twelve bus routes service Reservoir:

 : Reservoir station – La Trobe University. Operated by Dysons.
 : Whittlesea – Northland Shopping Centre via South Morang station. Operated by Dysons.
 : Coburg – Reservoir via Elizabeth Street. Operated by Ventura Bus Lines.
 : North East Reservoir – Northcote Plaza via High Street. Operated by Dysons.
 : Preston – West Preston via Reservoir. Operated by Dysons.
 : Pacific Epping – Northland Shopping Centre via Lalor, Thomastown and Reservoir. Operated by Dysons.
 : Pacific Epping – Northland Shopping Centre via Keon Park station. Operated by Dysons.
 : Reservoir station – North West Reservoir. Operated by Dysons.
 : Macleod – Pascoe Vale station via La Trobe University. Operated by Dysons.
 : Lalor – Northland Shopping Centre via Childs Road, Plenty Road and Grimshaw Street. Operated by Dysons.
 : Northcote – Regent station via Northland Shopping Centre. Operated by Dysons.
  : Chelsea station – Westfield Airport West. Operated by Kinetic Melbourne.

Cycling
The Merri Creek Trail and Darebin Creek Trail are shared-use recreational paths used by cyclists and walkers that pass through Reservoir.

Road
Reservoir has easy access to the Northern/Western Ring Rd, Hume Highway/Freeway, Tullamarine and Calder Freeways and Eastern Freeway.

Train
The area is serviced by four railway stations on the Mernda line: Reservoir, Regent, Keon Park and Ruthven.

The Victorian Government has announced that it will build an underground suburban rail loop, which will include a station at Reservoir.

Tram

Industry

Future Mountain Brewing and Blending is located on Plenty Road, Reservoir.

Education
 St Stephen's Parish Primary School
 Holy Name Primary School
 Reservoir Primary School
 Reservoir East Primary School
 Reservoir Views Primary School
 Reservoir West Primary School
 St Gabriel's Parish Primary School
 Reservoir High School
 William Ruthven Secondary College

Sport
 Reservoir Football Club and West Preston Football Club are Australian rules football teams. Both compete in the Northern Football League.
 Northern Rugby Union Football Club
 iceHQ ice hockey and figure skating
 Preston Lions FC play soccer in the Victorian State League Division 1 at B.T. Connor Reserve. 
 Northern Darts Association
 Northside Roller Derby
 Victorian cricketer Ray Harvey lives in Reservoir.
 Australian Rules Footballer Jason Heatley was born in Reservoir.

See also
 City of Preston – Reservoir was previously within this former local government area.

References

Suburbs of Melbourne
Suburbs of the City of Darebin